Charles Daniels (March 24, 1825 in New York City – December 20, 1897 in Buffalo, Erie County, New York, United States was an American lawyer and politician.

Life
He was taken to Toledo, Ohio at an early age, and learned his father’s trade of shoemaker. In 1842, he moved to Buffalo, New York, where he studied law. In 1847, he was admitted to the bar and commenced practice in Buffalo.

In 1863, he was appointed by Governor Horatio Seymour a justice of the New York Supreme Court, to fill the vacancy caused by the death of James J. Hoyt. Later that year, he was elected to the remainder of Hoyt's term, then re-elected to an eight-year term in 1869, and re-elected to a fourteen-year term in 1877, remaining on the bench until the end of 1891, when his term expired. In 1869, he was ex officio a judge of the New York Court of Appeals.

In 1878, he married Mrs. Mary E. Enos.

In the New York state elections of 1886, he ran for the New York Court of Appeals, but was defeated by Democrat Rufus W. Peckham, Jr.

He was elected as a Republican to the 53rd and 54th United States Congresses, and served from March 4, 1893, to March 3, 1897. He was Chairman of the Committee on Elections No. 1 (Fifty-fourth Congress).

He was buried at Forest Lawn Cemetery in Buffalo.

Sources

JUDGE DANIELS NOMINATED in NYT on September 30, 1886 [gives Buffalo as birthplace]
 Court of Appeals judges

1825 births
1897 deaths
New York Supreme Court Justices
Judges of the New York Court of Appeals
Politicians from Buffalo, New York
Republican Party members of the United States House of Representatives from New York (state)
19th-century American politicians
Lawyers from Buffalo, New York
19th-century American judges
19th-century American lawyers